Bəcirəvan or Badzhiravan or Badzhirovan or Bodzherevan may refer to:
Bəcirəvan, Barda, Azerbaijan
Bəcirəvan, Imishli, Azerbaijan
Bəcirəvan, Jalilabad, Azerbaijan